The 2019 Dockerty Cup was a football (soccer) knockout-cup competition held between men's clubs in Victoria, Australia in 2019, the annual edition of the Dockerty Cup.  Victorian soccer clubs from the National Premier Leagues Victoria divisions, State League divisions, regional, metros and masters leagues competed for the Dockerty Cup trophy.

The competition also served as Qualifying Rounds for the 2019 FFA Cup. In addition to the two Victorian A-League clubs, the four Preliminary Round 7 winners qualified for the final rounds of the 2019 FFA Cup, entering at the Round of 32.

The cup was won by Hume City, their first title.

Format

Prize fund
The prize fund is detailed below.

Preliminary rounds

Victorian clubs participated in the 2019 FFA Cup via the preliminary rounds. This was open to teams from the NPL, NPL2, 5 State League divisions, regional and metros leagues. Teams were seeded in terms of which round they would enter based on their division in 2019.

The four qualifiers for the final rounds were:

Semi finals
A total of four teams took part in this stage of the competition, with the matches played in July 2019. As a new rule for the semi-finals and final, a fourth substitution was allowed if the game went to extra time.

Final

References

Dockerty Cup